Clarence A. Clingenpeel (December 12, 1886 – December 2, 1975) was an American athlete and sports coach. He was best known for his time at Central College (now known as Central Methodist University), where he played several sports and later coached from 1914 to 1917, and again from 1925 to 1941. Clingenpeel also coached football at Austin College for one year and for seven years he coached football and basketball at Kemper Military School. He was inducted into the NAIA Hall of Fame in 1958 and later into the Central Methodist Hall of Fame in 1983.

Early life and education
Clingenpeel was born on December 12, 1886, in Delphos, Kansas. He attended Central College (now known as Central Methodist University) in Fayette, Missouri, and played several sports there for four years, including football, baseball, and basketball, being a "splendid athlete." He led the football team to a championship in 1911 while playing quarterback and was described in a 1925 article as being widely regarded as the "greatest catcher Central ever had." Prior to his coaching career, Clingenpeel worked for seven years as a journalist for The Kansas City Star.

Coaching career

In 1914, Clingenpeel was hired as the new athletic director at his alma mater. Among his duties in this position were head football coach, basketball coach, track and field coach, and baseball coach. In his first season as football coach, Clingenpeel led the team to "distinct success" after they had gone through "disappointment" in the past several years, compiling an overall record of 4–3, with wins over Tarkio (21–3), William Jewell (7–0), Kirksville (12–0), and Westminster (53–0), along with losses against Warrensburg (20–7), Drury (35–0), and Missouri Wesleyan (20–7), good enough for a second-place finish in the conference. The Kansas City Star described the team as the best Central had had in years.

In the 1914–15 basketball season, Clingenpeel led his team to an overall record of 3–7, and in baseball, his team compiled the same mark. The following year, he led the football team to a 2–5 record, the men's basketball team to a record of 5–7, the baseball team to a 6–7 mark, and also coached the women's basketball team, which won once in three matches.

After the 1916–17 sports season, Clingenpeel left Central to become the athletic director at Austin College in Sherman, Texas. The Kansas City Star recapped his three-year stint at the school:

Clingenpeel coached the Austin football team in 1917, while athletic director. He resigned in 1918 to become football coach at Kemper Military School. Clingenpeel also became the coach of the basketball team there, and was for a time their athletic director. In his first year as basketball coach, he turned out an "exceptional" team which won the conference championship in a "romp." Clingenpeel also led the football team to within a half-game of the championship in 1919. The next year, they posted one of the best high school seasons ever in that section of the country, according to The Kansas City Star. The Kemper team, although from a high school, played against colleges in Kansas and Missouri and was able to tie several of them.

Clingenpeel continued serving at Kemper until 1925, when he returned to his alma mater, Central College. One source said that his record at Kemper "is one that will long be noted." He became athletic director, football coach, track and field coach, and basketball coach at Central. Upon becoming football coach, he announced that "We will win one game this year." He was correct in his prediction, but had a "very successful" year otherwise, leading an inexperienced basketball team to the conference runner-up position, and producing a top track team.

Clingenpeel declared that in his second season as football coach they would win more games. He was again correct, and turned out a team that was among the best in school history, winning the championship, their first in 15 years, despite being outweighed by all their inter-conference opponents. The 1926 Ragout, Central's yearbook, described him as follows: "'Cling' is a shrewd coach, and has his heart and soul in his work. He instills into the veins of his teams that old 'never-give-up' spirit which is so prevalent in an Eagle team. 'Cling' has won a place in the hearts of all his men and also in the hearts of Eagle followers." Another edition discussed him as, "A maker of Champions and Leaders. A master strategist, a splendid athlete, and a gentleman–our coach."

Clingenpeel led both the football and basketball teams to the conference championships in 1928. In the 1930 season, he helped the football team compile a 9–0 mark and win the conference championship, the first unbeaten, untied team in school history. He also led the basketball team to a championship, and became coach of the baseball team around this time. Clingenpeel gave his position as track coach to George Kline around this time. In 1931–32, he led the basketball team to another conference championship, and it was written in The Ragout that championships "have come to be customary instead of occasional acquisitions."

Although the 1932–33 basketball team was very inexperienced, Clingenpeel again brought them to the conference championship. They did not win it in 1933–34, the first time in four years. Clingenpeel led the football team in 1934 to their first conference championship since 1930. He continued coaching the football and basketball teams until 1941, when he had to stop for a year due to an illness. His health returned in 1942; however, when he went back to continue coaching, the school told him that he had been dismissed. The Kansas City Star sports editor wrote that, "There's something wrong somewhere in a case like that," considering that Clingenpeel had served the college for nearly two decades, took a year off from illness, and was then abruptly notified that he had been dismissed after returning to health. He finished his tenure at Central with four football conference championships and five more in basketball.

Later life and death
After being dismissed from Central, Clingenpeel began serving in the personnel department at Pratt & Whitney.  He was named director of field activities for the Missouri State Chamber of Commerce in 1945. A few years later, he began operating a news agency bearing his name. Clingenpeel was presented with the Central College Distinguished Alumni Award in 1952. Six years later, he was inducted into the NAIA Hall of Fame. He died of a stroke, on December 2, 1975, in Fayette. Clingenpeel was posthumously inducted into the Central College (now Central Methodist) Hall of Fame in 1983, as a charter member.

Head coaching record

College football

References

External links
 

1886 births
1975 deaths
American football quarterbacks
Baseball catchers
Austin Kangaroos athletic directors
Austin Kangaroos football coaches
Central Methodist Eagles athletic directors
Central Methodist Eagles baseball players
Central Methodist Eagles football coaches
Central Methodist Eagles football players
Central Methodist Eagles men's basketball coaches
Central Methodist Eagles men's basketball players
High school basketball coaches in Missouri
High school football coaches in Missouri
People from Ottawa County, Kansas